Point Ephémère is a music venue in Paris, located at Canal Saint-Martin. Point Ephémère is a center for artistic events located in the 10th arrondissement of Paris in an old warehouse building. The venue combines artist in residence programming and live performances.

Background
Point Ephémère is led by a group of people that fifteen years transformed squatted buildings into temporary artist spaces. This dynamic art center opened October 13, 2004. It puts in place the necessary means to the home of artists (visual artists, musicians, dancers, designers) and provides tools for public recognition of their work.
Before the building was used as the fire station of Chateau-Landon.
Since opening, Point Ephémère hosts artists in residence spaces for (4 artists' studios, a dance studio, 5 music rehearsal studios) and offers a program of exhibitions, shows, concerts, parties, conferences, workshops, and unusual happenings. Point Ephémère hosts the festival AAO since its inception in 2009.

External links

 official site of Point Ephémère

Music venues in Paris
Buildings and structures in the 10th arrondissement of Paris
Music venues in France